Darwin LeOra Teilhet (May 20, 1904 – April 18, 1964) was an American mystery novelist, advertising executive, journalist and a film screenwriter and consultant.

Biography

Teilhet was born in Wyanet, Illinois, to a Dutch mother, and a father of French descent. As a teenager, he traveled in France and worked as a juggler in a circus there. He wrote a monthly column on broadcast radio for Forum magazine from 1932 to 1934 whilst he headed the broadcast radio advertisement unit of N. W. Ayer & Son.  Teilhet was an officer in the Office of Strategic Services serving first in making propaganda in Washington D.C. before being transferred to London and attaining the rank of major. He was scheduled to perform intelligence operations during Operation Overlord, yet was sent home to America after contracting pneumonia. He later became executive assistant to the president of Dole Pineapple in Hawaii.

Teilhet taught journalism classes at Stanford University, and worked as a screenwriter and consultant for various film producers.

Teilhet created his main detective protagonist, Baron von Kaz, a Viennese, at the instigation of James Poling of Doubleday Books.  He wrote some of his mystery novels with his wife, Hildegarde Tolman Teilhet (November 22, 1905 – January 24, 1999). Novels were published by Darwin Teilhet, Darwin L. Teilhet, Darwin and Hildegarde Teilhet or his pseudonyms, Cyrus Fisher (juvenile fiction), William H Fielding and Theo Durant. Teilhet was a Newbery Honor award winner for his Cyrus Fisher novel, The Avion My Uncle Flew.

Teilhet chose the pseudonym "Cyrus Fisher" as a tribute to his late father-in-law, Cyrus Fisher Tolman (1873–1942), Professor Emeritus of Economic Geology at Stanford University, as well as a tribute to his son Cyrus Jr. who died suddenly at the age of three months.  There is a "Cyrus Fisher Tolman Professor in the School of Earth Sciences" professorship named in his honor, at the Woods Institute for the Environment, Stanford University.

Teilhet died in Palo Alto, California. He and his wife are buried together in Golden Gate National Cemetery.

Novels
 Death Flies High (1931)
 Murder in the Air (1931)
 The Talking Sparrow Murders (1934)
 Bright Destination (1935)
 The Ticking Terror Murders (1935)
 The Crimson Hair Murders (1936) with Hildegarde Teilhet
 The Feather Cloak Murders (1936) with Hildegarde Teilhet
 Journey to the West (1938)
 The Broken Face Murders (1940) with Hildegarde Teilhet
 Trouble Is My Master (1942)
 Retreat From the Dolphin (1943)
 Odd Man Pays (1944)
 My True Love (1945)
 The Fear Makers (1945)
 The Avion My Uncle Flew (1946) as Cyrus Fisher
 Something Wonderful to Happen (1947)
 Ab Carmody's Treasure: Mystery and Adventure in Guatemala (1948) as Cyrus T. Fisher
 The Happy Island (1950)
 The Mission of Jeffery Tolamy (1951)
 The Unpossessed (1951) as William H Fielding
 Steamboat on the River (1952)
 Take Me As I Am (1952) as William H Fielding
 Beautiful Humbug (1954) as William H Fielding
 The Lion's Skin (1955)
 The Road to Glory (1956)
 The Hawaiian Sword (1956) as Cyrus T. Fisher
 The Big Runaround (1964) aka Dangerous Encounter

Selected filmography (writer)
 They Wanted to Marry (1937), from a short story
 No Room for the Groom (1952), from his novel, "My True Love"
 The Fearmakers (1958), from his novel, "The Fear Makers"

References

External links
 
 LibraryThing page
 US 1st Editions page
 
  (mainly as 'Teilhet, Darwin L., 1904–' without '1964', previous page of browse report) 

1904 births
1964 deaths
20th-century American novelists
American male novelists
American mystery writers
American male screenwriters
American children's writers
Newbery Honor winners
People from Bureau County, Illinois
Writers from Palo Alto, California
Stanford University faculty
People of the Office of Strategic Services
20th-century American male writers
Screenwriters from California
Screenwriters from Illinois
20th-century American screenwriters